Groß Tessiner See is a lake in the municipality Jürgenshagen, Mecklenburg-Vorpommern, Germany. At an elevation of 53 m, its surface area is 1.25 km². It is named after the village Groß Tessin, part of the municipality Glasin, on its western shore.

Lakes of Mecklenburg-Western Pomerania